The Reformist Socialist Party (Partito Socialista Riformista, PSR) was a tiny social-democratic political party in Italy.

It was founded after the Tangentopoli scandal, in opposition to the decision of Ottaviano Del Turco, then secretary of the Italian Socialist Party (PSI), to place it within the centre-left Alliance of Progressives coalition, dominated by the Democratic Party of the Left. Its leading members included Fabrizio Cicchitto and Enrico Manca. The party merged into the Socialist Party in 1996.

Fabrizio Cicchitto, who was a left-winger close to Riccardo Lombardi in the old PSI became the deputy-coordinator of Forza Italia and later member of The People of Freedom, while Enrico Manca, who was a centrist linked to Bettino Craxi, joined Democracy is Freedom – The Daisy in 2004 and the Democratic Party until his death in 2011.

Leadership
Secretary: Fabrizio Cicchitto (1994–1996)
President: Enrico Manca (1994–1996)

See also
 Italian Reformist Socialist Party

References

1994 establishments in Italy
1996 disestablishments in Italy
Defunct social democratic parties in Italy
Defunct political parties in Italy
Political parties disestablished in 1996
Political parties established in 1994